Yan Jing (born 28 October 1970) is a Chinese fencer. She competed in the women's individual épée event at the 1996 Summer Olympics.

References

External links
 

1970 births
Living people
Chinese female fencers
Olympic fencers of China
Fencers at the 1996 Summer Olympics
Asian Games medalists in fencing
Fencers at the 1990 Asian Games
Asian Games gold medalists for China
Medalists at the 1990 Asian Games
20th-century Chinese women